Saint Lucia Kings (formerly known as St Lucia Stars and St Lucia Zouks) are the representative team of Saint Lucia in the Caribbean Premier League (CPL) of cricket. It is one of the six teams created in 2013 for the inaugural season of the tournament. The Zouks won only 4 games out of 14 in the first two seasons finishing last and second last in the tournament respectively.

For the 2017 season, the franchise chose to rebrand under a new name and logo as the St Lucia Stars.

In 2018, St Lucia Stars finished fifth in Caribbean Premier League winning three out of their ten matches.

In the 2019 season, St Lucia finished fifth again and narrowly missed out on a semi-final spot.

In the 2020 season, St Lucia finished as Runner's up and missed out the opportunity to Win the season.

In 2021, Punjab Kings, the IPL franchise bought the team ownership and renamed it to Saint Lucia Kings.
Again in the 2021 season, St Lucia finished as Runner's up and missed out the opportunity to Win the season.

Current squad
 Players with international caps are listed in bold.
As of 4 April 2022

Result summary

Overall results 

Last updated: 15 September 2021

 Abandoned matches are counted as NR (no result)
 Win or loss by super over or boundary count are counted as tied.
 Tied+Win - Counted as a win and Tied+Loss - Counted as a loss.
 NR indicates no result.

Source: ESPNcricinfo

Administration and support staff

Statistics

Most runs 

Source: ESPNcricinfo, Last updated: 14 September 2021

Most wickets 

Source: ESPNcricinfo, Last updated: 14 September 2021

Seasons

Caribbean Premier League

The 6ixty

See also
 List of St Lucia Kings cricketers

References

External links
 St. Lucia Kings on CPLT20.com
 
 

Cricket in Saint Lucia
Cricket teams in the West Indies
Caribbean Premier League teams
Cricket clubs established in 2013
2013 establishments in Saint Lucia
Wadia Group
Dabur Group